Kings Row is a 1942 film starring Ann Sheridan, Robert Cummings, Ronald Reagan and Betty Field that tells a story of young people growing up in a small American town at the turn of the twentieth century. The picture was directed by Sam Wood. The film was adapted by Casey Robinson from a best-selling 1940 novel of the same name by Henry Bellamann. The musical score was composed by Erich Wolfgang Korngold, and the cinematographer was James Wong Howe. The supporting cast features Charles Coburn, Claude Rains, Judith Anderson and Maria Ouspenskaya.

Plot
In the small midwestern town of Kings Row, in 1890, five children know, and play with, each other: Parris Mitchell, a polite, clever little boy who lives with his grandmother; pretty blonde Cassandra Tower, daughter of the secretive Dr. Alexander Tower and a mother that is seen only through the upstairs window; the orphaned but wealthy and fun-loving Drake McHugh who is best friends with Parris; Louise Gordon, daughter of the town physician Dr. Henry Gordon; and the tomboy Randy Monaghan, from the "wrong side of the tracks", whose father, Tom, is a railroad worker.
 
Parris is both friends with and drawn to Cassandra, whom the other children avoid because her family is "strange". They play together regularly. The boys are best friends, and Randy plays with the boys sometimes as well. When Dr. Tower takes Cassie out of school, and she is confined at home, Parris does not see her for many years.

He finally meets her again when she opens the door for him to begin his medical studies under Dr. Tower's tutelage. However, she is very hesitant and says almost nothing. The next morning, Parris' best friend, Drake, says that he intends to marry Louise, who is in love with him as well, despite the disapproval of her father Dr. Gordon. Louise, however, refuses to defy her parents and will not marry him. As Parris continues his studies with Dr. Tower, Parris and Cassie begin a secret romance, seeing each other at Drake’s house. But he and Dr. Tower have a good relationship as well. Dr. Tower has interested Parris in psychiatry, which he intends to study in Vienna. Parris' grandmother becomes ill from cancer and dies as he is about to go overseas to Vienna for medical school.  Parris wants to marry Cassie after he returns from his training. One night Cassie comes desperately to him, begging him to take her with him to Vienna. When Parris hesitates, she runs away again, back home.

The next morning, Drake learns that Dr. Tower has poisoned Cassie and shot himself, and has left his entire estate to Parris. Drake tells Parris and gives him Dr. Tower's notebook, which showed that he killed Cassie because he believed he saw early signs that she might go insane like her mother, and he wanted to prevent Parris from ruining his life by marrying her, just as Tower's life had been ruined by marrying Cassie's mother.  

While Parris is in Vienna, Drake's trust fund is stolen by a dishonest bank official.  Drake is forced to work locally for the railroad, and his legs are injured in an accident when tiles fall on him. Dr. Gordon amputates both of his legs. Drake, who had been courting Randy before the accident, now marries her but is now embittered by the loss of his legs and refuses to leave his bed. Parris exchanges letters with Randy and he tells her how she might best support Drake emotionally. They decide to start a business with Parris' financial help, building houses for working families.  Parris returns from Vienna to Kings Row to support Drake. But, when Parris suggests they move into one of the homes they've built, away from the railroad tracks and sounds of the trains that plague Drake, he becomes hysterical and makes Randy swear to never make him leave the room.

Parris decides to remain there at Kings Row when he learns that Dr. Gordon has died, leaving the town with no doctor.  Louise reveals that her father amputated Drake's legs unnecessarily, because he hated Drake and thought it was his duty to punish wickedness.  Parris at first wishes to withhold the truth from Drake, fearing it will destroy his fragile recovery.  He considers confining Louise to a mental institution, even though she is not insane, to prevent the truth from being revealed to Drake and other victims of her father.

When out walking, he sees a woman named Elise sitting where Cassie used to sit, dressed similarly.  She has moved into his childhood home, and he becomes close to her and her father.  Parris discusses the problem regarding Louise with Elise. She persuades him to treat Drake like any other patient, rather than his best friend. Parris tells Drake what happened.  Drake reacts with laughter and defiance, wondering if Dr. Gordon thought he lived in his legs. He summons a renewed will to live instead of the deep clinical depression Parris had feared. Parris is now free to marry Elise, having helped his old friend return to a productive life.

Cast

Cast notes
 Twentieth-Century Fox originally sought to buy Bellamann's novel as a vehicle for Henry Fonda. Philip Reed, Rex Downing, and Tyrone Power were considered for the role of Parris.  In April 1941 Robert Cummings was mentioned as the leading favorite if Power could not be borrowed. Cummings did a screen test and by May had the role. Cummings was held up filming on a Deanna Durbin film but the filmmakers were willing to postpone for him. In September filming was shut down for a week as Cummings was recalled to do reshoots on the Durbin film.
 Ida Lupino, Olivia de Havilland and Ginger Rogers were initially considered for the role of Cassandra. Director Sam Wood pushed hard to cast Lupino, saying that she "has a natural something that Cassie should have." Wood believed that de Havilland, who refused the role, was too mature for the part. Lupino also refused it, despite Wallis' emphatic arguments, saying that it was "beneath her as an artist." Bette Davis wanted the part, but the studio was against it because it was believed that she would dominate the movie, and Davis later suggested Betty Field. Among the other actresses considered for Cassandra were Katharine Hepburn, Adele Longmire, Marsha Hunt, Laraine Day, Susan Peters, Joan Leslie, Gene Tierney and Priscilla Lane.
 James Stephenson was originally cast as Dr. Tower but died, and was replaced by Claude Rains.
 Before Ronald Reagan was cast, John Garfield was considered for the role of Drake McHugh, as were Dennis Morgan, Eddie Albert, Robert Preston, and Franchot Tone. Although Reagan became a star as a result of his performance, he was unable to capitalize on his success because he was drafted into the U.S. Army to serve in World War II. He never regained the star status that he had achieved from his performance in the film.

Production notes
Wolfgang Reinhardt refused an assignment to produce the film, saying, "As far as plot is concerned, the material in Kings Row is for the most part either censurable or too gruesome and depressing to be used. The hero finding out that his girl has been carrying on incestuous relations with her father... a host of moronic or otherwise mentally diseased characters... people dying from cancer, suicides–these are the principal elements of the story."

Filming started in July 1941 and continued until December.

The pivotal scene in which Drake McHugh wakes up to find his legs amputated posed an acting challenge for Reagan, who was supposed to say "Where's the rest of me?" in a convincing manner. In City of Nets, Otto Friedrich noted that the movie had a formidable array of acting talent, and the scene in which Reagan saw that his legs were gone was his "one great opportunity." Reagan recalled in his memoir that he had "neither the experience nor talent to fake it," so he undertook exhaustive research, talking to people with disabilities, and doctors and practicing the line every chance he got.

On the night before the scene was shot he had little sleep, so he looked suitably worn out, and Sam Wood shot the scene without rehearsal. He called out for Randy, which was not in the script, but Ann Sheridan was there and responded. The scene was extremely effective and there was no need for another take.

Kings Row and the Hays Code
 
A film adaptation of Bellamann's controversial novel, modeled on his home town of Fulton, Missouri, presented significant problems for movie industry censors, who sought to bring the film into conformity with the Hays Code. Screenwriter Casey Robinson believed the project was hopeless because of the Hays Code. Producer Hal B. Wallis said that Robinson felt "I was crazy to have bought so downbeat a property." Wallis urged him to reconsider, and it occurred to Robinson that he could turn this into the story of "an idealistic young doctor challenged by the realities of a cruel and horrifying world."

Joseph Breen, director of the Production Code Authority, which administered the Hays Code, wrote the producers that "To attempt to translate such a story to the screen, even though it be re-written to conform to the provisions of the Production Code is, in our judgment, a very questionable undertaking from the standpoint of the good and welfare of this industry."

Breen objected to "illicit sexual relationships" between characters in the movie "without sufficient compensating moral values", and also objected to "the general suggestion of loose sex...which carries throughout the entire script." Breen also voiced concern about the characterization of Cassandra, who is a victim of incest with her father in the novel, as well as the mercy killing of the grandmother by Parris also depicted in the novel, and "the sadistic characterization of Dr. Gordon." 

Breen said that any screenplay, no matter how well done, would likely bring condemnation of the film industry "from decent people everywhere" because of "the fact that it stems from so thoroughly questionable a novel. He said that the script was being referred to his superior, Will Hays, "for a decision as to the acceptability of any production based upon the novel, Kings Row."
 
Robinson, Wallis and associate producer David Lewis met with Breen to resolve these issues, with Wallis saying that the film would "illustrate how a doctor could relieve the internal destruction of a stricken community." Breen said that his office would approve the film if all references to incest, nymphomania, euthanasia and homosexuality, which had been suggested in the novel, be removed. All references to nude bathing were to be eliminated and "the suggestion of a sex affair between Randy and Drake will be eliminated entirely." It was agreed that Dr. Tower would know about the affair between Cassandra and Parris, and "that this had something to do with his killing of the girl."

After several drafts were rejected, Robinson was able to satisfy Breen.

Themes
Bellaman, a professor at Vassar College, was a disciple of Honoré de Balzac, and his novel was in the tradition of Winesburg, Ohio and was a forerunner of the popular 1950s novel Peyton Place.

The film begins with a billboard promoting Kings Row as "A Good Town. A Good Clean Town. A Good Town to Live In and a Good Place to Raise Your Children." In his book City of Nets, author Otto Friedrich says that beneath the tranquil small-town exterior was a "roiling inferno of fraud, corruption, treachery, hypocrisy, class warfare, and ill-suppressed sex of all varieties: adultery, sadism, homosexuality, incest."

The film is a eulogy for American small-town life in the Victorian era. At one point a character laments at seeing Parris' grandmother getting older: "A whole way of life. A way of gentleness and honor and dignity. These things are going... and they may never come back to this world."

Musical score
The film's musical score by Erich Wolfgang Korngold was so popular with the public that the Warner Brothers Music Department drafted a form-letter response to queries concerning recordings or sheet music. At the time, film scores for movie dramas were not published or recorded for commercial distribution.

A soundtrack was not commercially available until 1979 when Chalfont Records, with the composer's son George Korngold as producer and an orchestra conducted by Charles Gerhardt, made an early digital recording. Subsequently, the original soundtrack, with the composer conducting, has been released from an optical recording.

Kings Row is considered one of Korngold's more notable compositions. The original orchestral score was requested by the White House for the inauguration of President Reagan. Prolific film composer John Williams drew inspiration from this film's soundtrack for his famous Star Wars opening theme.

Before release of the film, the Los Angeles Daily News reported that Henry Bellamann "heads west to help Erich Wolfgang Korngold on the scoring" of the film, and that Bellamann used to be on the faculty of the Curtis Institute of Music in Philadelphia. This led Korngold to send a sarcastic letter to the head of studio publicity at Warner Brothers, writing "seriously, should I really stop working and wait for the arrival of Mr. Bellamann? ... However, if he shouldn't arrive in time to help me, I shall certainly be ready to 'head east'—perhaps I could help him in writing his new book!"

Reception

Box office 
According to Variety the film earned $2,350,000 in rentals in the US in 1942.

According to Warner Bros records it earned $3,143,000 domestically and $1,950,000 foreign.

Critical response 

The New York Times film critic Bosley Crowther panned Kings Row, which he described as being as "gloomy and ponderous" as the novel upon which it was based. "Just why the Warners attempted a picture of this sort in these times, and just why the corps of high-priced artists which they employed for it did such a bungling job," Crowther wrote "are questions which they are probably mulling more anxiously than any one else." Crowther wrote that the film "turgidly unfolds on the screen," and is "one of the bulkiest blunders to come out of Hollywood in some time." The performances, particularly Cummings', were, he wrote, "totally lacking in conviction." The film, he wrote, "just shows a lot of people feeling bad."

Later reviewers have viewed the movie favorably, however, and the film received a 100% rating from Rotten Tomatoes.

Time Out Film Guide described the film as "one of the great melodramas" and "as compulsive and perverse as any election, a veritable Mount Rushmore of emotional and physical cripples, including a surgeon with a penchant for unnecessary amputations, a girl who 'made friends on one side of the tracks and made love on the other'."

TV Guide wrote that Kings Row was "one of the most memorable melodramas of its day," in that it portrayed "a small town not with the poignancy and little joys of Thornton
Wilder's Our Town, but rather in grim, often tragic tones." The magazine described the film as "one of director Wood's finest films," and praised Robinson's screenplay "even if he cut out a death from cancer, deleted a mercy killing, and toned down the narrative's homosexual angle." It described Korngold's score as "haunting" and the sets "quite stunning." James Wong Howe's "gorgeous cinematography, meanwhile, maintains in deep focus many layers of drama, as befits this brooding tapestry."

Accolades 
The film was nominated for Academy Awards for Best Cinematography, Black-and-White (James Wong Howe), Best Director and Best Picture.

The film is recognized by American Film Institute in these lists:
 2005: AFI's 100 Years...100 Movie Quotes:
 Drake McHugh: "Where's the rest of me?" – Nominated
 2005: AFI's 100 Years of Film Scores – Nominated

Legacy 
In the film, Reagan's character, Drake McHugh, has both legs amputated by a sadistic surgeon, played by Coburn. When he comes to, following the operation, he gasps in shock, disbelief, and horror, "Where's the rest of me?" Reagan used that line as the title of his 1965 autobiography.  Reagan and most film critics considered Kings Row his best film. Reagan called the film a "slightly sordid but moving yarn" that "made me a star."

Television series 
The film was adapted into a 1955 television series, with Jack Kelly (who later portrayed Bart Maverick in Maverick with James Garner as Bret Maverick) in Cummings' role and Robert Horton (who subsequently played scout Flint McCullough in Wagon Train) performing Reagan's part.  The show appeared as one of three rotating series on the earliest William T. Orr production,  Warner Bros. Presents.   The other two series were Casablanca (1955 TV series), another TV version of a renowned movie (featuring Charles McGraw in Humphrey Bogart's role), and Cheyenne, starring Clint Walker, a Western later produced by Roy Huggins that went on to its own time slot for several years until it started rotating with Bronco starring Ty Hardin, another Warner Bros. Western.  At the conclusion of each episode of Warner Bros. Presents, host Gig Young would interview a different actor from a new Warner Bros. movie about the studio's latest theatrical release.  Kings Row ran for seven episodes.

See also 
 Ronald Reagan filmography

References

External links

 
 
 
 
 

1942 films
1940s coming-of-age drama films
1940s historical drama films
American black-and-white films
American coming-of-age drama films
American historical drama films
Articles containing video clips
Films scored by Erich Wolfgang Korngold
Films about amputees
Films about psychiatry
Films adapted into television shows
Films based on American novels
Films directed by Sam Wood
Films set in Vienna
Films set in 1890
Films set in the 1900s
Warner Bros. films
1940s English-language films
1940s American films